The Best of Sophie B. Hawkins is a compilation album released in 2002 collecting songs by American singer Sophie B. Hawkins. It is her first compilation album, and was released 10 years after her first studio album, Tongues and Tails. It contains no songs from what was then her most recent album, Timbre, released in 1999; instead, besides Hawkins' main singles (barring those from Timbre), it contains a variety of tracks from her first two albums that were not issued as singles, ending with an exclusive cover of "The Night They Drove Old Dixie Down", originally by The Band. The album was only released internationally, and not in Hawkins' home country of the United States. An album of the same title, also released as Essential Sophie B. Hawkins, was issued the following year there.

Track listing
All songs written by Sophie B. Hawkins, except where noted.

"Damn I Wish I Was Your Lover" – 5:25
"Right Beside You" (Chertoff, Hawkins, Lerman) – 4:47
"As I Lay Me Down" – 4:10
"Don't Don't Tell Me No" – 4:53
"California Here I Come" – 4:36
"Before I Walk on Fire" – 4:59
"We Are One Body" – 4:49
"I Want You" (Bob Dylan) – 5:18
"Don't Stop Swaying" – 5:28
"Only Love (The Ballad of Sleeping Beauty)" – 5:03
"I Need Nothing Else" – 4:16
"Did We Not Choose Each Other" – 4:26
"Let Me Love You Up" – 3:26
"The Night They Drove Old Dixie Down" (Robbie Robertson) – 5:28

Sophie B. Hawkins albums
2002 compilation albums
Albums produced by Stephen Lipson
Columbia Records compilation albums